Laurent Cantet (born 11 April 1961) is a French director, cinematographer and screenwriter. His film Entre les murs (The Class) won the top prize at the Cannes Film Festival in 2008.

Biography
Laurent Cantet was born in 1961 in the town of Melle, Deux-Sèvres in western France; his parents were schoolteachers. He went to university in Marseille to study photography, and then entered the Institut des Hautes Études Cinématographiques (IDHEC) in Paris where he graduated in 1986 His colleagues at IDHEC included Dominik Moll, Gilles Marchand and Robin Campillo. After initially working in television, he became assistant director to Marcel Ophuls for Veillées d'armes (1994), a documentary about the siege of Sarajevo. He went on to make some short films, often in collaboration with colleagues from film school. In 1998 Cantet was one of several young directors invited to make films for the European TV company Arte to mark the forthcoming year 2000, and he completed the mid-length film Les Sanguinaires (1999), about a group of friends who travel to an uninhabited island to escape the millennial celebrations.

His first feature film, with a screenplay written jointly with Gilles Marchand, was Ressources humaines  (Human Resources, 1999) about a management trainee working in his father's factory. This achieved both critical and popular success, and it won two César awards. His next film L'Emploi du temps (Time Out, 2001) continued his interest in employment issues, drawing upon a real-life case about a professional man who concealed his redundancy from his family. The screenplay was written jointly with Robin Campillo, who also worked on several of Cantet's later films. Social and political issues took on a more international perspective in Vers le sud (Heading South, 2005) about sexual tourism in Haiti. In Entre les murs (The Class, 2008) Cantet made a film which blended fiction and documentary exploring the daily life of a class of students in a Parisian school. The cast was composed entirely of non-professionals, including the teacher on whose book the film was based. The film won the Palme d'Or at the Cannes film festival. Subsequent projects have taken Cantet to Canada for Foxfire: Confessions of a Girl Gang (2012) and to Havana for Retour à Ithaque (Return to Ithaca, 2014), working in English and Spanish respectively. 

In France Cantet has demonstrated a long-standing concern for illegal migrant workers (the sans-papiers) and has supported a collective of French film-makers (the Collectif des cinéastes pour les sans-papiers) who have made a number of short films to bring wider attention to the risks faced by migrant workers. Another aspect of Cantet's interest in social issues is reflected in his preferred method for developing a film, particularly those which feature non-professional actors. He has said that he likes to give a lot of attention and time to the casting, seeking people who will play not themselves but a role similar to their own in real life of which they have a natural understanding (e.g. a factory manager and a trade unionist in Ressources humaines, the pupils in Entre les murs), and then to involve his actors in developing not only their own characters but sometimes the script as well, in a process of workshops and rehearsals.

This method was used by Cantet for Entre les murs, and he returned to it in L'Atelier (The Workshop, 2017) in which he worked with a group of young people from La Ciotat on the Mediterranean coast, exploring their present-day problems in a former shipbuilding town which has been radically transformed since its industrial past. Their fictional project in the film shows them collaborating in a workshop to write a novel about their town and drawing on their own experiences to enrich it, mirroring aspects of Cantet's own method in making the film.

Filmography

Other accolades
The 2001 film L'Emploi du temps was placed at 99 on Slant Magazine's best films of the 2000s, number 9 of The Guardian's Best Films of the Noughties, and number 11 at The A.V. Club's top 50 films of the 2000s (decade).

In 2015 Cantet received the Volta Career Achievement Award at the Dublin International Film Festival.

References

External links

1961 births
Living people
People from Deux-Sèvres
European Film Awards winners (people)
French film directors
French male screenwriters
French screenwriters
French cinematographers
Directors of Palme d'Or winners